John Treacy (born 4 June 1957 in Villierstown, County Waterford) is an Irish Olympian and former athlete, now a sporting administrator.

Athletic career 
Treacy attended St Anne's Post-Primary School in Cappoquin, County Waterford, Ireland, running more than seven miles to school every morning. He graduated from Providence College in the United States. In 1978 and 1979 he won the IAAF World Cross Country Championships in Glasgow, Scotland and Limerick, Ireland respectively.

At the 1984 Summer Olympics in Los Angeles he won a silver medal in the marathon, placing Ireland 33rd on the medals table.

Treacy was known as a tenacious runner who did not have an especially sharp final kick in track races. In the 1978 European Athletics Championships in Prague, he placed 11th in the fast 10,000-metre race and fourth in the slow and tactical 5,000-metre race, losing to Italy's Venanzio Ortis by just three tenths of a second.  In the 5,000-metre final, he lingered behind Great Britain's Nick Rose on the final back straight just after Rose had dropped from the lead group.

 In the 1980 Moscow Olympics, Treacy collapsed in his 10,000-metre heat with only 200 metres left, a victim of heat paralysis and dehydration.  Because Treacy had been running in fourth place when he collapsed and because only the top four runners qualified directly for the final from the three heats, his collapse allowed Finnish four-time Olympic champion Lasse Virén, who had been trailing him, to qualify directly for the final. Having recovered from his heat-induced collapse, Treacy placed seventh in the 5,000-metre final of those Olympics.
In the 1983 World Athletics Championships in Helsinki, Finland, Treacy was eliminated in the 10,000-metre heats.

In the 1984 Los Angeles Olympics, he placed ninth in the 10,000-metre final before crowning his athletics career with a silver medal in the men's marathon. Winner Carlos Lopes of Portugal was largely unchallenged for much of the race, with Treacy down the field until entering the top six around the 20-kilometre mark. Treacy continued to work his way up the rankings until entering the Los Angeles Coliseum stadium just behind second-placed British athlete Charlie Spedding. Treacy overtook Spedding with 150m to go, during which the Irish television commentary of Jimmy Magee listed the previous Irish Olympic medal winners up to that time, before culminating: "And for the 13th time, an Olympic medal goes to John Treacy from Villierstown in Waterford, the little man with the big heart."

After the Los Angeles Olympics, Treacy ran competitively until 1995, retiring following a road race held in his honour in Waterford, attended by the other two medalists from the 1984 Olympic marathon, Carlos Lopes and Charlie Spedding. While he did not win any more major international championships medals, Treacy did win the 1992 Los Angeles Marathon. At the 1986 European Athletics Championships in Stuttgart, he placed sixth in the 10,000-metre race.  In the 1987 World Athletics Championships in Rome, he placed twenty-sixth in the 10,000-metre race and thirteenth in the 5,000-metre final. He failed to finish the marathon at the 1988 Seoul Olympics and placed 51st in his final Olympic games in Barcelona in 1992. He won the 1993 Dublin Marathon.

Post-running career
Treacy is currently chief executive of the Irish Sports Council. He is married to Fionnuala and they have four children: Caoimhe, Deirdre, Sean, and Conor.

International competitions

See also
 Ireland at the 1984 Summer Olympics
 1984 in athletics (track and field)

References

External links
 

 John Treacy interview
 
 

1957 births
Sportspeople from County Waterford
Irish male long-distance runners
Irish male marathon runners
World Athletics Cross Country Championships winners
World Athletics Championships athletes for Ireland
Olympic athletes of Ireland
Athletes (track and field) at the 1980 Summer Olympics
Athletes (track and field) at the 1984 Summer Olympics
Medalists at the 1984 Summer Olympics
Olympic silver medalists in athletics (track and field)
Athletes (track and field) at the 1988 Summer Olympics
Athletes (track and field) at the 1992 Summer Olympics
Olympic silver medalists for Ireland
Providence College alumni
Sport Ireland officials
Living people